Deerbrook is an unincorporated community in Langlade County, Wisconsin, United States. Deerbrook is on County Highway E north of Antigo in the town of Neva. It has a post office with ZIP code 54424.

History
Deerbrook was named by Edward Dawson, a timber cruiser and prospector, who saw a deer drink from a nearby brook, and called the area "Deerbrook".

References

Unincorporated communities in Langlade County, Wisconsin
Unincorporated communities in Wisconsin